The 12th arrondissement of Marseille ("douzième"), commonly known as Marseille 12, is one of the 16 arrondissements of Marseille. It is governed locally together with the 11th arrondissement, with which it forms the 6th sector of Marseille.

Population

References

External links
 Official website
 Dossier complet, INSEE

Arrondissements of Marseille